The Ciuta is or was a breed of small mountain sheep from the province of Sondrio, in Lombardy in northern Italy. There has been no census of the breed since 1983, and it may be extinct; a small number were identified in 2001. It originates in the mountainous terrain of the Val Masino and the Valchiavenna, in an area where Lombard is spoken; ciuta means "little sheep" in the local language. It probably has common origins with the Ciavenasca breed from the same area. It is raised only for meat; the wool is of very poor quality, and the milk is sufficient only for the lambs. The breed is not recognised by the Ministero delle Politiche Agricole Alimentari e Forestali, the Italian ministry of agriculture and forestry, and is not among the forty-two autochthonous local sheep breeds of limited distribution for which a herdbook is kept by the Associazione Nazionale della Pastorizia, the Italian national association of sheep-breeders.

The breed was listed as "extinct" by the FAO in 2007.

References

Sheep breeds originating in Italy